Sanguinary may refer to:
an action accompanied by bloodshed or bloody violence
the common yarrow (Achillea millefolium), a flowering plant